The Mixed 10m Air Rifle Prone SH2 shooting event at the 2004 Summer Paralympics was competed  on 20 September. It was won by Minna Leinonen, representing .

Preliminary

20 Sept. 2004, 12:45

Final round

20 Sept. 2004, 16:00

References

X